This article contains economic statistics of the country Singapore. The GDP, GDP Per Capita, GNI Per Capita, Total Trade, Total Imports, Total Exports, Foreign Reserves, Current Account Balance, Average Exchange Rate, Operating Revenue and Total Expenditure are mentioned in the table below for years 1965 through 2018.

1965 to 2014

2014 to 2018

See also
 Economy of Singapore

References

Economy of Singapore
Statistics-related lists